Silver Stallion is a 1941 American Western film directed by Edward Finney and starring David Sharpe, LeRoy Mason and Chief Thundercloud.

Cast
 David Sharpe as Davey Duncan
 LeRoy Mason as Pascal Nolan
 Chief Thundercloud as Freshwater 
 Thornton Edwards as Tronco
 Walter Long as Benson
 Janet Waldo as Jan Walton
 Fred Hoose as Dad Walton

References

Bibliography
 Pitts, Michael R. Western Movies: A Guide to 5,105 Feature Films. McFarland, 2012.

External links
 

1941 films
1941 Western (genre) films
American Western (genre) films
Films directed by Edward Finney
Monogram Pictures films
1940s English-language films
1940s American films